The Wheel of Life is a famous boulder problem in the sport of rock climbing. Located in Hollow Mountain Cave in the Grampians of Australia and initially graded , it is now commonly considered to be .

Route
The problem, which consists of over 60 moves, was first completed by Dai Koyamada in 2004, and it links up three shorter problems that were established by climbers such as Klem Loskot and Fred Nicole (Extreme Cool, V8; Sleepy Hollow V12; Cave Rave, V13).
 
Although it is climbed without a rope, due to its length it may be considered to be a climbing route. It is commonly graded 8C as a boulder problem, and 9a as a route. Graham stated that it was in a league above 9a routes he had climbed, possibly even a 9a+.

Notable ascents
 Second ascent by the Australian boulderer Chris Webb Parsons, in 2007 - (VIDEO, YouTube)
 Third ascent by Ethan Pringle - (VIDEO)
 Fourth ascent by James Kassay, in 2011
 Fifth ascent by Australian climber Benjamin P. Cossey on 30 October 2011.
 Sixth and seventh ascents by Dave Graham and Ian Dory, in June 2012. Graham suggested a route grade of 9a+ (Ewbank 36), stating that it was "not possible to compare it to other boulder problems, due to its length", and that it was in a league above 9a routes he had climbed.
 In November 2012, James Kassay completed a more difficult finish to the problem, by linking it to the Amniotic World (V9), leading to the highest part of the cave. This new version of the problem was called The Wheel of Life Direct
 Ninth ascent by Daniel Woods in July 2013 - VIDEO
 Tenth ascent, after only three attempts, by Alexander Megos in July 2013. - (VIDEO)
 Repeated by Alex Barrows, 28th May 2016
Repeated by Tom O'Halloran, 20th October 2017
Repeated by Jake Bresnehan in September 2018
Repeated by Matt Hoschke in Feb 2019

See also
History of rock climbing
List of first ascents (sport climbing)
Midnight Lightning, famous  boulder in Camp 4 (Yosemite)
The Mandala, famous   boulder at The Buttermilks

References

External links 
The Wheel of Life video by Dai Koyamada with several other boulders up to v14 range

Wheel of Life, The